The Arnhem Coast fine-lined slider (Lerista stylis) is a species of skink found in the Northern Territory and Queensland in Australia.

References

Lerista
Reptiles described in 1955
Taxa named by Francis John Mitchell